Adhemarius daphne is a species of moth in the family Sphingidae. It was described by Jean Baptiste Boisduval in 1875, and it is known from Brazil, Bolivia, Argentina and Paraguay, as well as Cuba and Costa Rica.

There are probably at least two generations per year. In Brazil, adults have been recorded in March and November.

Subspecies
Adhemarius daphne daphne (Brazil, Bolivia, Argentina and Paraguay)
Adhemarius daphne cubanus (Rothschild & Jordan, 1908) (Cuba)
Adhemarius daphne interrupta (Closs, 1915) (Costa Rica)

References

Adhemarius
Moths described in 1875
Moths of North America
Moths of South America